Allium semenovii is an Asian species of wild onion native to Xinjiang, Kazakhstan, Tajikistan, and Kyrgyzstan. It grows at elevations of 2000–3000 m.

Allium semenovii has bulbs up to 15 mm in diameter. Scapes are up to 50 cm tall. Leaves are flat, up to 15 mm wide. Umbels are spherical, densely crowded with many yellow flowers.

References

External links
 

semenovii
Onions
Flora of temperate Asia
Plants described in 1868